Grimes Point, in Churchill County, Nevada near Fallon, is a  archeological site that was listed on the U.S. National Register of Historic Places in 1972.  It was listed for its potential to yield future information.

Along the 'Grimes Point Trail', many petroglyphs can be seen. The land is managed by the Bureau of Land Management.

Archaeology
A small rock shelter on Grimes Point was discovered in 1939 by guano-miners; Georgia Wheeler recorded the site as 1-1C (Cave no. 16) and named it Grimes Burial Shelter. The location is to the east of Fallon, Nevada, and just to the south of the Spirit Cave, where the Spirit Cave mummy was recovered.

The matting discovered at Grimes Point was later recognized as 'the diamond plaiting type', which is a unique weave. It was dated in 1995, to 9,470 years old.

Human remains
Associated were the well-preserved remains of a child, about ten years old, and small fragments of an older individual.

Richard Jantz and Douglas Owsley conducted further research on these remains.

Archaeological complex
The Grimes Point site is a part of a much larger archaeological complex, which includes a wide variety of materials, caves, shelters, and other archaeological sites. The site is located on what was once a shoreline of Pleistocene Lake Lahontan and is best known for the cupules, which are small pits dug out of the rock surface and found on hundreds of boulders in the area.

This site was the primary locality used by archaeologists Robert Heizer and Martin Baumhoff to define the "Pit and Groove Style" of rock art, which is thought by many to be the oldest type of rock art found in Nevada. It does share certain characteristics with other Great Basin rock art known to be of great antiquity called Great Basin Carved Abstract. Specifically, the depth of engraving and the width of the engraved lines are much greater than other rock art types that appear to be of more recent manufacture, a characteristic also noted elsewhere.

Archaeologist Karen Nissen included Grimes Point in her analyses of rock art sites in western Nevada and concluded that rock art was generally associated with hunting locales, an idea popular at that time but somewhat less so today.

The site is located off U.S. 50 east of Fallon and open to the public year-round.

Gallery

References 

Archaeological sites on the National Register of Historic Places in Nevada
National Register of Historic Places in Churchill County, Nevada
Oldest human remains in the Americas